Moawhango is a rural community in the northern part of Rangitikei District of the Manawatū-Whanganui region of New Zealand's North Island. It is situated 19 km north of Taihape and 91 km northeast of Marton. Nearby Moawhango are located Moawhango River and Lake Moawhango.

History and culture
Moawhango is bastion of cultural engagement within the iwi boundary of Ngāti Whitikaupekaa. Originally known to local Māori as Te Riu o Puanga, during European settlement the valley became known as Moawhango. There are two marae within the valley, Te Riu o Puanga marae which holds the whare rūnanga (ancestral meeting house) Oruamatua; and Moawhango marae where the whare puni (ancestral sleeping house) of Whitikaupeka stands. Ngāti Whitikaupeka occupy the northern boundary for the Mōkai Pātea confederation of iwi, which includes Ngāi Te Ohuake extending eastward to the summit of the Ruahine range, Ngāti Tamakōpiri to the west, and Ngāti Hauiti to the south. Through intricate whakapapa (genealogy) connections, Ngāti Whitikaupeka are also affiliated to Ngāti Tūwharetoa and Ngāti Kahungunu, and maintain their independent autonomy on the lands that surround Moawhango, while affirming their complex whakapapa relationships with others.

Historic buildings 
There are two historic buildings both of which are listed Category II by Heritage New Zealand.

The Batley Memorial Chapel was built in 1902 by Robert and Emily Batley as a memorial to their daughter Nellie who drowned in 1899. It was designed by Alfred Atkins in Gothic Revival style and built from locally-made bricks.

Whitikaupeka Church was built between 1903 and 1905 by the hapū Ngāti Whiti to commemorate tribal elders. It is built of wood and the design is attributed by Alfred Atkins.

Geography
Moawhango River is a 62 km long river with its sources in the Kaimanawa Range and ending at Lake Moawhango. It passes through the town and then outflows into the Rangitikei River southeast of Taihape. Lake Moawhango contains a large population of wild rainbow trout.

Government and politics

Local government

Moawhango forms part of the Taihape ward of the Rangitikei District Council, which elects three of the eleven district councillors. The three representatives of the ward are Richard Aslett, Angus Gordon and Ruth Rainey, elected in the 2013 Rangitikei local elections. The current Mayor of Rangitikei is Andy Watson. The mayor and all councillors are due for re-election in October 2016.

National government
Moawhango, like much of the rest of the Rangitikei District, is located in the general electorate of Rangitīkei and in the Māori electorate of Te Tai Hauāuru. Rangitīkei is a safe National Party seat since the 1938 election with the exception of 1978–1984 when it was held by Bruce Beetham of the Social Credit Party. Since 2011, it is held by Ian McKelvie.

Te Tai Hauāuru is a more volatile seat, having been held by three different parties since 1996, i.e. New Zealand First, the Māori Party and the Labour Party. Since 2014 it is held by Adrian Rurawhe of the Labour Party.

Demographics

Moawhango had a population of 651 according to the 2013 New Zealand census. This is a decrease of 45, or 6.5 percent, since the 2006 census. There were 243 occupied dwellings, 39 unoccupied dwellings, and no dwellings under construction.

Of the residential population, 348 (53.5%) were male compared to 48.7% nationally, and 300 (46.5%) were female, compared to 51.3% nationally. The district had a median age of 39.8 years, 1.8 years above the national median age of 38.0 years. People aged 65 and over made up 8.8% of the population, compared to 14.3% nationally, and people under 15 years made up 20.7%, compared to 20.4% nationally.

The meshblock's ethnicity is made up of (national figures in brackets): 84.0% European (74.0%), 26.2% Māori (14.9%), 1.0% Asian (11.8%), 2.4% Pacific Islanders (7.4%), 0.0% Middle Eastern, Latin American or African (1.2%), and 4.9% Other (1.7%).

Moawhango had an unemployment rate of 3.0% of people 15 years and over, compared to 7.4% nationally. The median annual income of all people 15 years and over was $31,700, compared to $28,500 nationally. Of those, 31.6% earned under $20,000, compared to 38.2% nationally, while 20.0% earned over $50,000, compared to 26.7% nationally.

Transport
To get to the nearest town, Taihape, it is a 19 km drive south via Te Moehau Road and Spooners Hill Road. State Highway 1 goes through Taihape, connecting Cape Reinga and Wellington; through this state highway InterCity buses can be used with ten daily coach services. These include: Auckland–Wellington, Wellington–Auckland and Tauranga–Wellington (throughout different times of the day).

Education

References

External links
Moawhango river fishing

Populated places in Manawatū-Whanganui
Rangitikei District
Ngāti Whitikaupeka